Stowe Lane is a cricket ground in Colwall, Herefordshire.  The first recorded county match on the ground was in 1974, when the Worcestershire Second XI played the Glamorgan Second XI in the Second XI Championship. The first Minor Counties Championship match played the on the ground was in 1993, and between Herefordshire and Cheshire. From 1993 to present, the ground has hosted 17 Minor Counties Championship matches and 6 MCCA Knockout Trophy matches (typically hosting a match from both tournaments each year).

The ground has also hosted a single List-A match between Herefordshire and the Sussex Cricket Board in the 2000 NatWest Trophy.

The ground is the birthplace of the Women's Cricket Association, formed in 1926 by a group of enthusiasts after a cricket holiday in Malvern.

In local domestic cricket, Stowe Lane is the home ground of Colwall Cricket Club.

References

External links
Stowe Lane on CricketArchive
Stowe Lane on Cricinfo

Cricket grounds in Herefordshire
Sports venues completed in 1926
Herefordshire County Cricket Club